The streaked rosefinch (Carpodacus rubicilloides) is a true finch species (family Fringillidae). It is found on the Himalayan Plateau. Its natural habitat is boreal shrubland.

Two subspecies are recognised:
C. r. rubicilloides - eastern Tibet to central and southern China
C. r. lucifer - southern Tibet and the Himalayas

References

streaked rosefinch
Birds of North India
Birds of Tibet
Birds of Central China
streaked rosefinch
Taxonomy articles created by Polbot